Nicolo "Cola" Schiro (born Nicolò Schirò; ; September 2, 1872April 29, 1957) was an early Sicilian-born New York City mobster who, in 1912, became the boss of what later become known as the Bonanno crime family.

Schiro's leadership of the gang would see it orchestrate the "Good Killers" murders in New York, New Jersey, and Detroit. Schiro's gang also controlled gambling and protection rackets in Brooklyn, engaged in bootlegging during Prohibition, and printed counterfeit money.

A conflict with rival mafia boss Joe Masseria would force Schiro out as boss, after which he returned to Sicily.

Early life
Nicolò Schirò was born on September 2, 1872, in the town of Roccamena, in the Province of Palermo, Sicily to Matteo Schirò and his wife, Maria Antonia Rizzuto. His father's family came from the Arbëreshë community of Contessa Entellina. A few years later, Schiro's family moved to his mother's hometown in nearby Camporeale.
 
Schiro immigrated to the United States in 1897. By May 1902, he was living in the Williamsburg section of Brooklyn, following a return trip to Sicily.

In April 1905, Schiro was arrested for operating a butcher shop on a Sunday contrary to New York's Blue laws. He would later become a yeast salesman and broker.

Mafia boss
Schiro became the new head of the local mafia centered in Williamsburg in March 1912, replacing Sebastiano DiGaetano.

Secret Service informant Salvatore Clemente reported in November 1913 that Schiro was aligned with the Morello crime family in a war against fellow New York mafia boss, and capo dei capi, Salvatore D'Aquila. Schiro later developed a more neutral stance, siding with neither D'Aquila's gang nor the Morello gang.

Schiro's gang ran the Williamsburg area numbers gambling racket while extorting local Italian immigrants through Black Hand and protection rackets. If their extortion money was not paid, the victims' homes or businesses could be vandalized or destroyed.

Schiro ran his gang conservatively, conducting its criminal activity primarily among Sicilian immigrants and not collaborating with non-Sicilian gangs. He was never arrested during his time as boss, avoiding attention from authorities and the media.

Schiro developed close relationships with local business and political leaders; and was on the board of directors of the local United Italian-American Democratic Club.

Schiro's first application for United States citizenship was rejected in 1913 due to his "lack of knowledge of the US Constitution". He later successfully naturalized as an American citizen in 1914.

In 1919, the Bureau of Investigation reviewed a list of Black Hand suspects in southern Colorado compiled by the sheriff of Huerfano County. On the list of names was Schiro gangster Frank Lanza, with the sheriff writing that Lanza had arrived in Colorado from New York "every May pretending to buy cheese but comes to organize Black-handers".

"The Good Killers"

On November 11, 1917, two Schiro gangsters, Antonio Mazzara and Antonino DiBenedetto were shot to death near the intersection of North 5th and Roebling streets in Brooklyn. One gunman, Antonio Massino, was arrested near the scene but another, Detroit mobster Giuseppe Buccellato, escaped. Buccellato killed Mazzara and DiBenedetto after they refused to divulge the whereabouts of fellow Schiro gangster, Stefano Magaddino. Magaddino had orchestrated the murder earlier that March of Giuseppe's brother and fellow Detroit gangster, Felice Buccellato due to the mafia clan of Magaddino and Vito Bonventre feuding with the mafia clan of the Buccellatos back in their hometown of Castellammare del Golfo.

1917 Detroit autoworker shootings
Determined to kill but unable to locate Giuseppe Buccellato, Schiro and Magaddino decided to target his family. Giuseppe's cousin, Pietro Buccellato, worked at the Ford Motor Company factory in Highland Park, Michigan and Schiro arranged with Detroit mafia boss Tony Giannola to have him murdered.

On December 8, 1917, a Romanian autoworker named Joseph Constantin, who was mistaken for Pietro Buccellato, was shot and wounded.

Back in Brooklyn, on December 10, Francesco Finazzo, a dock worker related to Pietro Buccellato, was shot and killed by the Schiro gang outside his home on the same corner where Mazzara and DiBenedetto were murdered a month earlier.

On December 19, another Romanian autoworker in Detroit was mistaken for Pietro Buccellato. Paul Mutruc was shot several times in the back and then shot twice in the head, killing him.

On December 22, as Pietro Buccellato waited with other passengers to board an approaching trolley, two gunmen fired multiple shots into Buccellato. An errant shot through one of the trolley windows nearly hit a passenger. Buccellato survived long enough to be taken to a hospital where he told police, before dying, he was attacked "on account of his cousin".

Murder of Camillo Caiozzo
A barber named Bartolo Fontana turned himself into the New York police in August 1921, confessing to murdering Camillo Caiozzo a couple of weeks earlier in New Jersey. Salvatore Cieravo, a New Jersey innkeeper who helped Fontana dispose of Caiozzo's body had just been arrested. Fontana claimed he murdered Caiozzo at the behest of the "Good Killers", a group of leading mafiosi in the Schiro gang who hailed from Castellammare del Golfo, in retaliation for Caiozzo's involvement in the 1916 murder of Stefano Magaddino's brother, Pietro Magaddino, back in Sicily. Fontana fearing he might be murdered by Schiro's gang, agreed to help police set up a sting operation. Stefano Magaddino met Fontana at Grand Central Station to give Fontana $30 to help him flee the city. After the exchange, Magaddino was arrested by a group of undercover police. Vito Bonventre, Francesco Puma, Giuseppe Lombardi and two other gangsters were subsequently arrested for their involvement in the murder.

Fontana revealed that the "Good Killers" were also responsible for a string of other murders. Some of the victims were connected to the Buccellato mafia clan in Castellammere del Golfo, while others had complained after being cheated in gambling rackets run by the Schiro gang. Also targeted were supporters of Salvatore Loiacano, who had taken over the Morello gang with Salvatore D'Aquila's backing. Loiacano was murdered on December 10, 1920, several months after Giuseppe Morello had been released from prison. According to a March 1, 1921 article in the New York Evening World, seven men had placed their hands on Loiacano's corpse during his funeral and vowed revenge. Within a few months, three of the vow makers – Salvatore Mauro, Angelo Patricola, and Giuseppe Granatelli were murdered and a fourth, Angelo Lagattuta was shot and severely wounded. Fontana named them all as victims of the "Good Killers". Morello had made a deal with Schiro, his earlier ally against D'Aquila, to kill Loiacano's supporters with people unfamiliar to them.

New Jersey decided not to pursue conspiracy charges in the Caiozzo murder. Charges against Magaddino were dropped despite the New York police officers' testimony about the sting linking him to the murder, as well as the charges against Bonventre. Only the charges against Fontana and the three men who helped dispose of the body - Puma, Lombardi, and Cieravo - remained. Francesco Puma was murdered on a New York street while out on bail awaiting trial, with a stray bullet from the shooting also hitting a seven-year-old girl. Fontana went to prison for Caiozzo's murder while the charges against Cieravo and Lombardi were eventually dropped. Magaddino fled New York City after his release, ending up in the Buffalo, New York area.

1920s and Prohibition

Several Schiro gangsters became mafia bosses in other cities – Frank Lanza in San Francisco, Stefano Magaddino in Buffalo, and Gaspare Messina in New England. Schiro was also close to future Los Angeles boss, Nick Licata.

In April 1921, Schiro admitted Nicola Gentile into his gang in order to protect Gentile from capo dei capi Salvatore D'Aquila as a show of Schiro's independence from D'Aquila.

Schiro gangster, Giovanni Battista Dibella was arrested (under the alias Piazza) on July 14, 1921, when over $100,000 worth of whiskey and numerous forged medicinal liquor permits were seized during a raid by Prohibition agents Izzy Einstein and Moe Smith at Dibella's olive oil warehouse in Brooklyn. Schiro had been a witness at Dibella's wedding in 1912. On September 12, 1922, Dibella's brother, Salvatore, was arrested and later convicted (also under the alias Piazza) of killing 17 year-old Gutman Diamond, a messenger for Western Union, while shooting at another bootlegger.

Counterfeit money and racial attack
On August 2, 1922, Secret Service agents arrested Schiro gangster Benjamin Gallo, along with four others, for operating a sophisticated counterfeiting plant at a bakery on Rockaway Avenue in Brooklyn. There agents found dyes, presses, paper, and hundreds of dollars worth of counterfeit $5, $10, and $20 bills; along with an illicit alcohol still.

Six days later, a banquet was held at Benjamin Gallo's restaurant in Brooklyn. An African American named George Mendes went to the banquet and sat by the door. After several minutes Mendes was approached and told "You're liable to get the Ku Klux Klan treatment for obstinate colored folks." Mendes pointed out that he had bought a ticket to the banquet and was entitled to a seat. He was then stabbed and beaten by Gallo and a crowd of banquet diners. Mendes survived and was taken to a hospital. Gallo was arrested again for the attack.

Bootlegging and immigration fraud
Future boss Joseph Bonanno illegally immigrated to the U.S. during the mid-1920s, soon joining the Schiro gang and becoming a protege of Salvatore Maranzano. In his autobiography, Bonanno writes he thought Schiro was "a compliant fellow with little backbone" and "extremely reluctant to ruffle anyone". Bonanno's second cousin, Vito Bonventre, remained a leader within Schiro's gang following his arrest and release during the "Good Killers" affair. During Prohibition, Bonventre developed a widespread bootlegging operation with Bonanno recalling "Next to Schiro, Bonventre was probably the most wealthy" of the gang.

Salvatore Maranzano, a Castellammare del Golfo-born son-in-law of a Sicilian mafia boss in Trapani, joined the Schiro gang in the mid-1920s. He helped it create an extensive bootlegging network in Dutchess County, New York, along with a ring providing fraudulent immigration and naturalization documents to Italians smuggled into the United States.

Between 1923 and 1928, Schiro felt secure enough in his position as boss to make three trips to Europe.

In January 1929, Schiro traveled to Los Angeles to attend the wedding of the son of San Francisco boss Frank Lanza.

Ouster and return to Sicily
Salvatore D'Aquila was murdered on October 10, 1928. Fellow New York boss Joe Masseria was selected to replace D'Aquila as the new capo dei capi. Following his elevation, Masseria began demanding monetary tributes from other mafia gangs. Schiro provoked Masseria's ire after warning San Francisco boss Frank Lanza of a mafia plot to kidnap him.

Masseria demanded Schiro pay $10,000 and step down as boss of his mafia crime family in order to spare his life.

After being forced out, Schiro returned to his hometown of Camporeale, Sicily.

Judicial summons for Schiro and other officers of the Masterbilt Housing Corporation were published in Brooklyn newspapers in the fall of 1931.

In 1934, a memorial was dedicated in Camporeale to its soldiers killed during World War I. It was built from donations collected by Schiro from Camporealese immigrants in America.

Schiro was stripped of his U.S. citizenship following a request by the American consulate in Palermo on October 14, 1949. He died in Camporeale on April 29, 1957.

See also

Castellammarese War
Crime in New York City

Notes

References
Citations

Sources

External links
Struggle for Control - The Gangs of New York, article by Jon Black at GangRule.com.
Detroit fish market murders spark Mafia war, article by Thomas Hunt at The Writers of Wrongs.
Two killed at Castellammarese colony in Brooklyn, article by Thomas Hunt at The Writers of Wrongs.
New York Mob Leaders - Bonanno at The American Mafia.
Nicolo Schiro information in the FBI file of James Lanza, at ''Internet Archive.

1872 births
1957 deaths
Gangsters from the Province of Palermo
Italian emigrants to the United States
American people of Albanian descent
American people of Arbëreshë descent
Italian people of Arbëreshë descent
People from Williamsburg, Brooklyn
Prohibition-era gangsters
American gangsters of Sicilian descent
Bosses of the Bonanno crime family
People with acquired American citizenship 
Former United States citizens